Sky High or Skyhigh may refer to:

Business
 Sky High Aviation Services, an airline based in the Dominican Republic

Film and television
 Sky High (1922 film), an American silent film
 Sky High (1951 film), a US Air Force comedy with Sid Melton
 Sky High (1986 film), an American comedy film
 Sky High (2003 film), a supernatural action film
 Sky High (2005 film), an American Disney live-action comedic superhero family film
 Sky High (2020 film), a Spanish crime thriller film
 "Sky High", a season five episode of the TV series Hercules: The Legendary Journeys
 Sky High (TV series), a live-action, supernatural Japanese television drama series

Music
 Sky High, a 1925 revised version of the musical comedy Whirled into Happiness
 "Sky High" (song), a 1975 single by the band Jigsaw
 Sky High, a 2012 album by Mike Posner
 Sky High!, a 1976 album by American soul/R&B group Tavares
 "Sky High", a song by Ben Folds Five from their 2012 album The Sound of the Life of the Mind
 "Sky High", a song by Juice WRLD and Young Thug that has not yet released

Other
 Sky High, a 1987–1998 Hardy Boys Casefiles novel
 Skyhigh (manga), a 2003 Japanese manga written by Tsutomu Takahashi
 Sky High (horse) (1957–1973), outstanding Australian Thoroughbred racehorse and sire

See also
 Ski Hi Lee (born 1921), heavyweight professional wrestler